The London Awards for Art and Performance is awarded in 11 different art categories, by the London Festival Fringe.

It is awarded each year, at a central London venue, and is presented to artists and performers who have made an outstanding contribution to their art form.

Awards

References

External links 
Debut Contemporary Art on the 2011 Awards Ceremony (archived)
Fringe Report on the London Awards for Art and Performance 2011

Arts festivals in England
British awards
Art and Performance